Ina Ivanova (born 26 June 1986) is a beauty pageant titleholder who was officially crowned Miss New Zealand International 2010 on 19 June 2010.  She represented New Zealand at the 50th Miss International beauty pageant in Chengdu, China in November 2010. Miss International is one of the four Grand Slam pageants in the world, the other three being Miss Universe, Miss World and Miss Earth.

Previous Titles Include

Miss Tui 2005, Ivanova beat over 70 contestants for the title after which she got numerous magazine spreads.

Miss University Wellington 2006

Miss University New Zealand 2006. She represented New Zealand at World Miss University in Seoul, Korea in 2006.
 
Miss Hawaiian Tropic New Zealand 2009 - 1st Runner up & Best in Eveningwear.

In 2007 she was named in Ralph Magazine's '200 Sexiest Women on The Planet'.

References

External links
 https://web.archive.org/web/20081023023052/http://www.miss-international.org/

1986 births
Living people
New Zealand female models
Bulgarian emigrants to New Zealand
Miss International 2010 delegates
Miss New Zealand winners